Jaroslav Levinský (born 11 February 1981) is a professional doubles tennis player from the Czech Republic.

Levinsky reached a career-high singles ranking of World No. 239, achieved on 23 September 2002. He also reached a career-high doubles ranking of World No. 24, achieved on 16 July 2007.

Levinsky's debut on the ATP Tour came in doubles, at the 2001 Croatia Open. Granted a wild card entry alongside compatriot Daniel Vacek, they prevailed in their first round match against Italian duo Massimo Bertolini and Cristian Brandi 6–3, 6–2. They were defeated in the second round by fourth seeds and fellow Czech's Radek Štěpánek and Petr Luxa 2–6, 6–7(4–7).

Levinsky made his ATP Tour single debut at the 2003 Dutch Open, where he advanced through 3 rounds of qualifying to gain a main draw birth. He defeated Juan Giner 6–1, 5–7, 7–6(7–2), Gorka Fraile 3–6. 6–3, 6–4 and Xavier Pujo 7–6(7–4), 6–2 respectively in qualifying before losing in the first round to Andre Sa 2–6, 6–4, 6–7(2–7).

Levinsky reached 6 singles finals throughout his career, with a record of 1 win and 5 losses. Additionally he reached 57 doubles finals in his career, with a record of 35 wins and 22 losses which includes a 5–10 record at the ATP Tour level and a 23–9 record in doubles finals at the ATP Challenger Tour level.

At the 2010 Australian Open, Levinsky reached the Mixed Doubles final alongside Russian WTA player Ekaterina Makarova, where they were defeated by the pairing of Cara Black and Leander Paes in straight sets 5–7, 3–6.

The last matches he played were at the 2014 US Open where he lost in the first round of both the men's doubles and mixed doubles draws. He subsequently coached Kristýna Plíšková for two years, before the two parted ways in April 2021.

Grand Slam finals

Mixed doubles: 1 (0–1)

ATP career finals

Doubles: 15 (5–10)

ATP Challenger and ITF Futures finals

Singles: 6 (1–5)

Doubles: 42 (30–12)

Performance timelines

Doubles

Mixed doubles

References

External links
U.S. Open 2006
 
 

1981 births
Living people
Czech male tennis players
People from Valašské Meziříčí
Sportspeople from the Zlín Region